Dzorapor was a historic region of Armenia, it is located in the province of Gugark.

Former regions of Armenia
History of Ardahan Province